Fugitive from Sonora is a 1943 American Western film directed by Howard Bretherton and written by Norman S. Hall. The film stars Don "Red" Barry, Wally Vernon, Lynn Merrick, Harry Cording, Ethan Laidlaw and Pierce Lyden. The film was released on July 1, 1943, by Republic Pictures.

Plot

Cast  
Don "Red" Barry as Parson Dave Winters / Ted Winters aka Keeno Phillips
Wally Vernon as Jack Pot Murphy
Lynn Merrick as Dixie Martin
Harry Cording as Iron Joe Martin
Ethan Laidlaw as Hack Roberts
Pierce Lyden as Henchman Bill Slade
Gary Bruce as Tom Lawrence
Kenne Duncan as Henchman R. J. Cole 
Tommy Coats as Henchman Ed
Frank McCarroll as Henchman Harris

References

External links
 

1943 films
American Western (genre) films
1943 Western (genre) films
Republic Pictures films
Films directed by Howard Bretherton
American black-and-white films
1940s English-language films
1940s American films